See peel tower for the generic structure

The memorial tower to Sir Robert Peel, high above Ramsbottom was planned and erected at the same time as Bury was preparing its statue to the then recently deceased statesman who was born in Bury.

The tower occupies a prominent position on Harcles Hill (known locally as "Holcombe Hill" due to its location next to Holcombe village) 1,100 feet (335 m) above sea level. The monument is believed to have been designed by members of the memorial committee who included the local textile entrepreneur and philanthropist William Grant. Grant was said to have been responsible for the site, which was in a direct line from his own house, Nuttall Hall and St Andrew's Church.

A public subscription provided the £1,000 needed to build the tower. The stone for the tower was obtained from the hillside. The Peel Tower was opened in September 1852, the day after the inauguration of the Baily's statue in Bury.

As at the earlier ceremony Frederick Peel was the principal guest of honour, and he declared the monument to be a splendid memorial to his father and to the principles of free trade. Local speakers included Joshua Knowles and John Robinson Kay. Unfortunately, large numbers who had travelled by excursion train from Salford arrived too late to witness the ceremony.

Inside the entrance to the tower is an extract from Peel's speech to the House of Commons in 1846. It emerged later that the tower had been planned and built in such haste that the necessary permission had not been obtained from the owner of the land, the Duke of Buccleuch. This matter was eventually rectified in 1868 when the land was transferred into the keeping of six trustees, on the condition that it would not be used for contentious public meetings.

If the tower, in the words of the Manchester Guardian, is not "a specimen of architectural beauty", it does provide a conspicuous landmark, and it also has a viewing platform from which to look across the surrounding countryside. The original internal staircase eventually became unsafe and was bricked up; later, the tower was reconditioned and a new staircase provided. A local Easter tradition entails people walking up the hill on Good Friday, often rolling hard-boiled eggs down the steep sides.

The tower was renovated in 1929 and at various other times. The tower closed after the Second World War in 1947 and was reopened and rededicated in November 1985 by Conservative Councillor Alice Maders.
The tower was then floodlit later that decade.

The award-winning short film, Date Jà Vu, was filmed near Peel Monument in April 2021. It was directed by Peter Adamson.

References

Buildings and structures in the Metropolitan Borough of Bury
Hills of the West Pennine Moors
Monuments and memorials in Greater Manchester
Robert Peel
Tourist attractions in the Metropolitan Borough of Bury
Ramsbottom